In the United Kingdom, community empowerment networks (CENs) are networks of a collection of local community, voluntary and third sector organisations and groups, set up by the central government as part of an initiative to foster community involvement in regeneration at a local level.  They get together periodically to discuss issues of concern to them in relation to regeneration plans.  CENs exist locally across the UK.  A CEN forms an important but small part of a Local Strategic Partnership.

Statement from the Improvement and Development Agency's Website idea statement:

See also
 Community Empowerment Network

References

Community development
Community empowerment